Matt Currie (born 22 February 2001) is a Scottish rugby union player for Edinburgh Rugby in the United Rugby Championship. Currie's primary position is centre.

Rugby Union career

Professional career
Currie signed for Edinburgh academy in June 2020. He made his Pro14 debut in Round 12 of the 2020–21 Pro14 against , coming on as a replacement.

External links
itsrugby Profile

References

2001 births
Living people
Scottish rugby union players
Edinburgh Rugby players
Rugby union centres